Roberto Castelli (born 3 March 1969) is an Italian boxer. He competed in the men's light heavyweight event at the 1992 Summer Olympics.

References

External links
 

1969 births
Living people
Italian male boxers
Olympic boxers of Italy
Boxers at the 1992 Summer Olympics
People from Treviglio
Light-heavyweight boxers
Sportspeople from the Province of Bergamo